Bernie the Bolt may refer to:

 A catchphrase and crossbow operator on The Golden Shot
 Bernie Wright (born 1952), an English footballer